The 2003 Primera División de Chile season was both 73rd and 74th season of top-flight football in Chile.

Torneo Apertura

The 2003 Campeonato Nacional Apertura Copa Banco del Estado was the 73rd Chilean League top flight tournament, in which Cobreloa won its sixth league title after eight years.

Qualification stage

Group standings

Aggregate table

Repechaje

Playoffs

First round

Knockout stage

Finals

Top goalscorers

Pre-Copa Sudamericana 2003 Tournament

Torneo Clausura

The 2003 Campeonato Nacional Clausura Copa Banco del Estado was the 74th Chilean League top flight tournament, in which Cobreloa won its seventh league title after beating Colo-Colo in the finals.

Qualification stage

Group standings

Aggregate table

Re-qualifier

Playoffs

First round

Knockout stage

Finals

Top goalscorers

References

External links
RSSSF Chile 2003

Apertura